Kulkarni Chaukatla Deshpande is an Indian Marathi language drama film written and directed by Gajendra Ahire and produced by Smita Vinay Ganu under the banner of Smita Film Production. The film is co produced by Ajit Madhavrao Potdar and Seema Niranjan Alpe. The film stars Sai Tamhankar in titular role of 'Kulkarni Chaukatla Deshpande', who is a rebellious middle class girl, the film focuses on her relationships and unfolds the journey of different relations on the path of her life. The film also features Rajesh Shringarpure in pivotal role. The film was released on 22 November 2019.

Synopsis
Jaya (Sai Tamhankar) scripts a new life for herself after walking out on marriage, challenging outdated norms that a woman should abide by in a marriage. She finds love and a career in Mumbai but faces a new set of challenges when their kids find it difficult to accept their courtship.

Cast
 Sai Tamhankar as Jaya
 Rajesh Shringarpure as Satish
 Nikhil Ratnaparkhi as Jaya's ex-husband
 Rohan Shah
 Narendra Bhide
 Soumil Shringarpure
 Neena Kulkarni as Jaya's mother

Release
Kulkarni Chaukatla Deshpande was released theatrically on 22 November 2019.

References

External links
 

2019 films
Indian drama films
2010s Marathi-language films
2019 drama films